Josefina Albarracín de Barba (1910–2007) was a Colombian sculptor. She was born in Bogotá, and studied at the capitol's Escuela de Bellas Artes. In 1940, she took part in the first Salón de Artistas Colombianos and won the third prize for her piece in wood El Obrero. From the 1940s to the 1960s, she taught at the fine arts school of the Pontificia Universidad Javeriana. In 1950, she participated in the eighth edition of the Colombian Artists' Salon and this time won the first prize with her sculpture Muchacha campesina. Among her other noted works are: Cabeza de muchacha, Busto de Montoya y Flórez, and Hombre del mercado.

She was married to the Spanish sculptor Ramón Barba who greatly influenced her work. Barba died in 1965; the following year, Albarracín organized a retrospective on his work at the Biblioteca Luís Ángel Arango in Bogotá.

References

External links
Josefina Albarracín de Barba, ColArte
Interview with Albarracín, 1995 (Spanish)

1904 births
2007 deaths
20th-century Colombian sculptors
20th-century Colombian women artists
Colombian women sculptors
People from Bogotá
Academic staff of the Pontifical Xavierian University
Date of birth missing
Date of death missing